Sajad Mohammadian (born 15 November 1983) is an Iranian Paralympic athlete. He represented Iran at the 2016 Summer Paralympics held in Rio de Janeiro, Brazil and he won the silver medal in the men's shot put F42 event. At the 2020 Summer Paralympics in Tokyo, Japan, he won the silver medal in the men's shot put F63 event.

At the 2017 World Championships he won the silver medal in the men's shot put F42 event and at the 2019 World Championships he won the bronze medal in the men's shot put F63 event.

References

External links 
 

Living people
1983 births
Place of birth missing (living people)
Iranian male shot putters
Paralympic athletes of Iran
Athletes (track and field) at the 2016 Summer Paralympics
Athletes (track and field) at the 2020 Summer Paralympics
Medalists at the 2016 Summer Paralympics
Medalists at the 2020 Summer Paralympics
Paralympic silver medalists for Iran
Paralympic medalists in athletics (track and field)
Medalists at the World Para Athletics Championships
21st-century Iranian people